Megan Mayhew Bergman (born December 23, 1979) is an American writer, author of the books Almost Famous Women and Birds of a Lesser Paradise.
In 2015, she won the Garrett Award for Fiction.

Life
She graduated from  Duke University with a masters and Bennington College with an MFA.

She is the author of the short story collections Birds of a Lesser Paradise and Almost Famous Women.  In 2016, she was awarded a fellowship at the American Library in Paris.

In 2019, she wrote a column for The Guardian on the American south and climate change, which won the Reed Environmental Journalism Award from the Southern Environmental Law Center 
.

She also wrote an environmental column for The Paris Review in 2016. Her work has twice appeared in Best American Short Stories, and on NPR's Selected Shorts.

She served as the Associate Director of the MFA program at Bennington College from 2015–2017, and later the Director of the Robert Frost Stone House Museum.  She is now the Director of the Bread Loaf Environmental Writers Conference at Middlebury College.
She lives in Shaftsbury, Vermont. with her husband and two daughters.

She is a senior fellow at the Conservation Law Foundation in Boston, MA.

Works

References

External links 
 
 

21st-century American novelists
American women novelists
1979 births
Living people
21st-century American women writers